Evelina Sašenko-Statulevičienė (born 26 July 1987) is a Lithuanian jazz singer of Polish-Ukrainian descent, who was born and lives in Lithuania.

Biography
Sašenko was born in Rūdiškės, into a Polish-Ukrainian family from the Vilnius Region. She studied at the Lithuanian Academy of Music and Theatre. Sašenko started her music career as a child. She is a prize winner of Dainų dainelė, the national Lithuanian children music festival. In 2009, she participated in the LTV opera contest Triumfo arka gaining fame and recognition. She is also known for participating in various television projects.

Eurovision
In the 2010 Lithuanian Eurovision national final Sašenko reached the 3rd place. A year later she won the national final. She represented Lithuania in the Eurovision Song Contest 2011 with the song "C'est ma vie". During her participation in the 2011 Eurovision, she wanted to participate under her Polish name, Ewelina Saszenko. She finished in 19th place in the final in Düsseldorf, Germany. She planned to participate in the 2021 Lithuanian Eurovision national final but later withdrew.

Personal life 
In 2018, Sašenko married Giedrius Statulevičius. She currently lives in Trakai, Lithuania.

References

External links

 

1987 births
Living people
English-language singers from Lithuania
Eurovision Song Contest entrants of 2011
Lithuanian Academy of Music and Theatre alumni
Eurovision Song Contest entrants for Lithuania
21st-century Lithuanian women singers
Lithuanian jazz singers
Lithuanian opera singers
Lithuanian people of Polish descent
Lithuanian people of Ukrainian descent
People from Trakai District Municipality